Spinadesco is a comune (municipality) in the Province of Cremona in the Italian region Lombardy, located about  southeast of Milan and about  west of Cremona.

Spinadesco borders the following municipalities: Acquanegra Cremonese, Castelvetro Piacentino, Cremona, Crotta d'Adda, Monticelli d'Ongina, Sesto ed Uniti.

References

External links
 Official website

Cities and towns in Lombardy